Rimo I is the main summit of the Rimo massif with an elevation of .

Geography 
It lies in the northern part of the remote Rimo Muztagh, a subrange of the Karakoram range. It is located about 20 km northeast of the snout of the Siachen Glacier and is the world's 71st highest mountain. Rimo means "striped mountain". The Rimo Glacier, originating here, drains to the Shyok river.

Due to its remote location in the heart of the eastern Karakoram, Rimo was little-known and almost entirely unvisited until the twentieth century. Explorers Filippo De Filippi and Philip and Jenny Visser visited the area in 1914 and 1929 respectively. Adding to its isolation is the unsettled political and military situation between India and Pakistan in the region, especially on the nearby Siachen Glacier. This means that India controls access to the massif.


Rimo massif
The Rimo massif consists of six peaks sharing the Rimo name. In addition to Rimo I, they are:

The others are more independent peaks further north. Rimo III is the 98th highest mountain in the world (Rimo II is unranked, lacking sufficient prominence).

The massif heads the large Central Rimo Glacier (on the north side) and South Rimo Glacier (on the east side), as well as the smaller North Terong Glacier (on the west side).

Climbing history
The first attempts on the Rimo massif were in 1978, by a Japanese expedition which had little success, in 1984 (first ascent of Rimo IV, by an Indian army expedition) and in 1985, by a well-organized Indian/British expedition led by famed Himalayan expert Harish Kapadia. That expedition climbed Rimo III (Dave Wilkinson and Jim Fotheringham were the summit party) but did not succeed on Rimo I.

The first, and so far only, the ascent of Rimo I was made in 1988 by an Indian/Japanese team led by Hukam Singh and Yoshio Ogata. They climbed the south face to the southwest ridge, starting from a significant pass called Ibex Col on the south side of the mountain. The ascent involved 1500m of significant technical climbing.

See also
 List of highest mountains
 Harish Kapadia

References

Sources
 Jerzy Wala, Orographical Sketch Map of the Karakoram, Swiss Foundation for Alpine Research, Zurich, 1990.
 

Mountains of Ladakh
Seven-thousanders of the Karakoram